Manoba subtribei is a moth in the family Nolidae. It was described by Hui-Lin Han and Cheng-De Li in 2008. It is found in Yunnan, China.

References

Moths described in 2008
Nolinae